Jacques-Louis Lions (3 May 1928 – 17 May 2001) was a French mathematician who made contributions to the theory of partial differential equations and to stochastic control, among other areas.  He received the SIAM's John von Neumann Lecture prize in 1986 and numerous other distinctions. Lions is listed as an ISI highly cited researcher.

Biography
After being part of the French Résistance in 1943 and 1944, J.-L. Lions entered the École Normale Supérieure in 1947.
He was a professor of mathematics at the Université of Nancy, the Faculty of Sciences of Paris, and the École polytechnique.

In 1966 he sent an invitation to Gury Marchuk, the soviet mathematician to visit Paris. This was hand delivered by General De Gaulle during his visit to Akademgorodok in June of that year.

He joined the prestigious Collège de France as well as the French Academy of Sciences in 1973.
In 1979, he was appointed director of the Institut National de la Recherche en Informatique et Automatique (INRIA), where he taught and promoted the use of numerical simulations using finite elements integration. Throughout his career, Lions insisted on the use of mathematics in industry, with a particular involvement in the French space program, as well as in domains such as energy and the environment.
This eventually led him to be appointed director of the Centre National d'Etudes Spatiales (CNES) from 1984 to 1992.

Lions was elected President of the International Mathematical Union in 1991 and also received the Japan Prize and the Harvey Prize that same year. In 1992, the University of Houston awarded him an honorary doctoral degree.  He was elected president of the French Academy of Sciences in 1996 and was also a Foreign Member of the Royal Society (ForMemRS) and numerous other foreign academies.

He has left a considerable body of work, among this more than 400 scientific articles, 20 volumes of mathematics that were translated into English and Russian, and major contributions to several collective works, including the 4000 pages of the monumental Mathematical analysis and numerical methods for science and technology (in collaboration with Robert Dautray), as well as the Handbook of numerical analysis in 7 volumes (with Philippe G. Ciarlet).

His son Pierre-Louis Lions is also a well-known mathematician who was awarded a Fields Medal in 1994.  Both father and son have received honorary doctorates from Heriot-Watt University in 1986 and 1995 respectively.

Books
with Enrico Magenes: Problèmes aux limites non homogènes et applications. 3 vols., 1968, 1970
Contrôle optimal de systèmes gouvernés par des équations aux dérivées partielles. 1968
with L. Cesari: Quelques méthodes de résolution des problèmes aux limites non linéaires. 1969
with Roger Dautray: Mathematical analysis and numerical methods for science and technology. 9 vols., 1984/5; translated from Analyse mathématique et calcul numérique pour le sciences et le techniques by Ian Sneddon
as editor with Philippe Ciarlet: Handbook of numerical analysis. 7 vols.
with Alain Bensoussan, Papanicolaou: Asymptotic analysis of periodic structures. North Holland 1978
with Roland Glowinski and Raymond Trémolières: Numerical analysis of variational inequalities, North Holland 1981 2011 pbk edition
 
 
with John E. Lagnese: Modelling Analysis and Control of Thin Plates.

See also
Aubin–Lions lemma
Lions–Lax–Milgram theorem
Interpolation space
Variational inequality

References

External links
Obituary on SIAM
Obituary in Automatica 
 
 

1928 births
2001 deaths
People from Grasse
École Normale Supérieure alumni
20th-century French mathematicians
21st-century French mathematicians
Mathematical analysts
Officers of the French Academy of Sciences
Foreign associates of the National Academy of Sciences
Foreign Members of the Royal Society
Foreign members of the Chinese Academy of Sciences
Foreign Members of the USSR Academy of Sciences
Foreign Members of the Russian Academy of Sciences
PDE theorists
Nancy-Université alumni
Presidents of the International Mathematical Union